Darwin Jamar Walker (born June 15, 1977) is a former American football defensive tackle.  He was originally drafted by the Arizona Cardinals in the third round of the 2000 NFL Draft.  He played college football at Tennessee.

Walker has been a member of the Philadelphia Eagles, Buffalo Bills and Chicago Bears. He now works for Fox 29 in Philadelphia as a pre and post game analyst for the Philadelphia Eagles.  He is also on the Board of Directors for Pennoni & Associates, responsible for creating business opportunity, utilizing his vast relationship network. Darwin Walker has many family members throughout the South Carolina and Atlanta area. Some family that are not mentioned much associated with Darwin are Douglas and Daron Walker.

Early years
Walker went to Walterboro High School in South Carolina and was a letterman in football and track and field. He also set the State Record in the Shot-Put, throwing over 63 feet, which has been subsequently broken by 1 inch.  Further, he graduated 4th in his 4A High School class. Darwin is the epitome of Student-Athlete.

College career
Walker attended North Carolina State University for one year and would later transfer to the University of Tennessee, where he won a National Championship with the Tennessee Vols in 1998.

Professional career

Arizona Cardinals
Walker was drafted by the Arizona Cardinals in the third round of the 2000 NFL Draft, but was released before playing a game.

Philadelphia Eagles
Subsequently, Walker was claimed off waivers by the Philadelphia Eagles during the 2000 season, where he played through the 2006 season.

Buffalo Bills
He was then traded on March 26, 2007 (along with a conditional 2008 draft pick) to the Buffalo Bills for linebacker Takeo Spikes and quarterback Kelly Holcomb.  However, there was a proviso to that trade stating that if Walker did not report to Bills training camp by August 5, 2007, he would be returned to the Eagles in exchange for a sixth-round draft pick in 2008.  He reportedly held out for a contract extension and never reported to Buffalo's training camp that year.

Chicago Bears
On July 29, 2007, the Buffalo Bills traded Walker's rights to the Chicago Bears in exchange for an undisclosed draft pick in 2008 (the Bears were in need of a defensive tackle after having waived troubled defensive lineman Tank Johnson in the 2007 offseason).

Carolina Panthers
On April 28, 2008, he signed with the Carolina Panthers.

Career statistics

References

External links
 

1977 births
Living people
American football defensive tackles
Arizona Cardinals players
Buffalo Bills players
Carolina Panthers players
Chicago Bears players
Philadelphia Eagles players
Tennessee Volunteers football players
People from Walterboro, South Carolina
Players of American football from South Carolina
NC State Wolfpack football players